Scrap Happy Daffy is a 1943 Warner Bros. Looney Tunes short directed by Frank Tashlin. The cartoon was released on August 21, 1943, and stars Daffy Duck.

In the World War II-themed story, Daffy is the guard of a scrap yard, doing his part to help the United States win the war against the Nazis, but the Nazis decide to destroy his scrap pile by sending a billy goat out to eat everything in sight.

The short was the final appearance of Daffy Duck in black and white theatrical cartoons.

Scrap Happy Daffy lapsed into the public domain in the United States in 1971.

Plot
Daffy is a guard at a scrap pile, encouraging Americans to "Get the tin out", "Get the brass out", "Get the iron out" and especially "Get the lead out". Singing We're in to Win, Daffy goes over the various things Americans can send to help with the war effort. He calls Hitler "Schikelgruber", which is the birth name of his father. However, Fuehrer Adolf Hitler who reads about Daffy's scrap pile helping to beat Benito Mussolini, isn't very happy about this and responds to this by giving his men the following order: "Destroy that scrap pile!"

With the word out, a Nazi German submarine fires a torpedo to the scrap pile — which has a billy goat inside, and the goat immediately starts eating everything in sight. Daffy, hearing the noise, tries to find out what's making the noise. After temporarily pointing a rifle at a reflection of himself (thinking that he cornered someone else), Daffy finds the goat hiccuping with the garbage inside him and amiably offers him a glass of Alka-Seltzer. However, when Daffy sees the swastika that the goat (whom he derides as a "tin termite") is wearing on his collar, he starts messing with the goat. Temporarily getting the better of the goat, Daffy is almost undone when he tries to whack the goat with a mallet - but the mallet gets stuck in the goat's horns and the goat knocks Daffy around.

Daffy is ready to call it quits (saying "What I'd give for a can of spinach now", a direct reference to Popeye whose theatrical cartoons are now owned by WB, but at the time were a major competitor to them), but is encouraged by the ghosts of his 'ancestors' — ducks who landed on Plymouth Rock, who encamped at Valley Forge with George Washington, who explored with Daniel Boone, who sailed with John Paul Jones, and who stood in for Abraham Lincoln. Daffy's spirits back up when he realizes, "Americans don't give up, and I'm an American... duck!", and then he turns into "Super American" in a reference to Superman (whose owner, DC Comics, is now a WB subsidiary itself). Daffy flies after the goat, knocking him around. The goat makes a run for the submarine, but Daffy repels all bullets shot at him and starts yanking on the periscope. Just then, the scene changes to Daffy yanking on a fire hose and getting hosed down. Daffy wakes up, thinking it was all just a dream — until he looks up at the Nazi submarine sitting on top of the scrap pile, where the Nazis tell Daffy, "Next time you dream, include us out!"

Reception
Animator Eric Goldberg writes, "Despite the film's jingoistic nature, it still boasts all the hallmarks of a great Tashlin cartoon: Dynamic, stylized poses in the animation. Graphically styled layouts and backgrounds. And outrageous humor — we dissolve from the back end of a horse with a black tail to the forelock on Adolf's face; the goat is capable of doing a four-footed military goosestep. Scrap Happy Daffy is one of the classic World War II propaganda cartoons."

Home media
This cartoon was colorized in 1995, with a computer adding color to a new print of the original black and white cartoon. This preserved the quality of the original animation.  However, this new colorized version was never broadcast on American television, presumably due to its outdated subject matter. A clip of this cartoon (which, oddly, was featured colorized and restored) was shown on a documentary about World War II-era cartoons ("ToonHeads: The Wartime Cartoons") and on a documentary on Frank Tashlin on the third volume of the Looney Tunes Golden Collection,  and is featured independently on the Looney Tunes Golden Collection: Volume 5 and the Looney Tunes Platinum Collection: Volume 3. (shown in its original black and white format). The original black and white cartoon is also available as a special feature for the DVD release of the Warner Bros. 1943 movie Air Force. This cartoon has now fallen into the public domain because the copyright was not renewed after 1971, as such, it can be found on low budget public domain vhses and DVDs.

Voice cast
 Mel Blanc - Daffy Duck, Adolf Hitler, Nazi Soldiers, Submarine Captain, Billy Goat, Great-Great-Great-Great-Great-Uncle Dillingham Duck, Minuteman Duck, Pioneer Duck, Admiral Duck, Lincoln Duck & Daffy's Ancestors
 Dorothy Lloyd - Whistle
 Tedd Pierce- Nazi crowd on scrap pile

References

External links

1943 films
1943 animated films
American World War II propaganda shorts
American black-and-white films
Looney Tunes shorts
Warner Bros. Cartoons animated short films
Short films directed by Frank Tashlin
Cultural depictions of Adolf Hitler
Cultural depictions of Benito Mussolini
Cultural depictions of Hideki Tojo
Cultural depictions of Abraham Lincoln
1940s American animated films
Animation based on real people
World War II films made in wartime
Daffy Duck films
Films produced by Leon Schlesinger
Films scored by Carl Stalling